The province of Ilocos Sur has 768 barangays comprising its 32 towns and 2 cities.

Barangays

References

.
Ilocos Sur